Rhys Michael Timothy Carré (born 8 February 1998) is a Wales international rugby union player who plays for Cardiff Rugby as a loosehead prop.

Carré made his debut for the Cardiff in 2016 having previously played for the organisation's academy team. He joined Saracens for the 2019-20 season before returning to Cardiff the following season.

International
Carré made his debut for Wales 31 August 2019 in the starting line up for the world cup warm up match versus Ireland. He was subsequently selected in Wales 2019 World Cup Squad.

International tries

References

External links

Cardiff Blues profile

1998 births
Living people
Cardiff Rugby players
Rugby union players from Cardiff
Saracens F.C. players
Wales international rugby union players
Welsh rugby union players
Rugby union props